Teotônio Vilela is a municipality located in the western of the Brazilian state of Alagoas. Its population was 44,372 (2020) and its area is 298 km².

In 2021 Bolsonaro visited it on his 1000-day-in-office celebration.

References

Municipalities in Alagoas